The 2000 UEFA European Under-21 Championship was the 12th staging of UEFA's European Under-21 Championship. The final tournament was hosted by Slovakia from 27 May to 4 June 2000. The tournament had 47 entrants. Northern Ireland competed for the first time. For the first time a finals tournament with two groups of four teams was held, with one of those teams, Slovakia, having been chosen as the hosts. The top four teams in this competition qualified for the 2000 Summer Olympics.

Italy won the competition for the fourth time, thus qualified for the Olympic Games finals, alongside Czech Republic, Slovakia and Spain.

Qualification 

The 47 national teams were divided into nine groups (seven groups of 5 + two groups of 6). The records of the nine group runners-up were then compared. The top seven joined the nine winners in a play-off for the eight finals spots. One of the eight qualifiers was then chosen to host the remaining fixtures.

Qualified teams 

1 Bold indicates champion for that year
2 Italic indicates host for that year
3 England were originally scheduled to play two legs against Yugoslavia. However, the first leg which was supposed to have taken place in Belgrade was cancelled due to political tensions. An alternative leg in Luxembourg was also cancelled due to security reasons. A second leg at Mini Estadi in Barcelona was held on 29 March 2000, which England won 3–0.

Squads

Venues 
Four venues were selected for the competition.

Match officials 
Seven match officials and nine assistants were selected for the competition, including two officials representing the Asian Football Confederation (AFC), Selearajen Subramaniam from Malaysia and Hamdi Al Kadri from Syria.

Matches

Group stage

Group A

Group B

Third place play-off

Final

Goalscorers 
Andrea Pirlo was the top goalscorer of three goals. He was also announced as the UEFA Golden Player award recipient.
3 goals

  Andrea Pirlo

2 goals

  Igor Tudor
  Lukáš Došek
  David Jarolím
  Roberto Baronio
  Peter Babnič

1 goal

  Darko Miladin
  Anthony Šerić
  Milan Baroš
  Tomáš Došek
  Marek Jankulovski
  Adam Petrouš
  Libor Sionko
  Andy Campbell
  Carl Cort
  Francis Jeffers
  Ledley King
  Frank Lampard
  Danny Mills
  Gianni Comandini
  Gionatha Spinesi
  Nicola Ventola
  Anthony Lurling
  Mark van Bommel
  Jan Vennegoor of Hesselink
  Miguel Ángel Angulo
  Jordi Ferrón
  Albert Luque
  Marián Čišovský
  Vratislav Greško
  Szilárd Németh
  Serhat Akın
  Ahmet Dursun

Medal table and Olympic qualifiers 
 Italy, Czechia, Spain and Slovakia qualified for Olympic Games finals.

References

External links 
 2000 UEFA European Under-21 Championship at UEFA.com
 2000 UEFA European Under-21 Championship at Rec.Sport.Soccer Statistics Foundation

 
UEFA European Under-21 Championship
E
UEFA
UEFA
UEFA
May 2000 sports events in Europe
June 2000 sports events in Europe
Sports competitions in Bratislava
2000s in Bratislava
2000 in youth association football